Wang Aoran (born 5 February 1997) is a Chinese tennis player.

Wang has a career high ATP singles ranking of 877 achieved on 29 October 2018. He also has a career high ATP doubles ranking of 392 achieved on 15 October 2018. Wang has won 6 ITF doubles titles.

Wang made his ATP main draw debut at the 2014 ATP Shenzhen Open, in the doubles draw partnering Ouyang Bowen.

ATP Challenger and ITF Futures finals

Doubles: 16 (9–7)

External links

1997 births
Living people
Chinese male tennis players
21st-century Chinese people